Charles Russell House may refer to:

in the United States
(by state then city)
Charles Russell House (Winchester, Massachusetts), listed on the National Register of Historic Places (NRHP)
Charlie and Nancy Russell Honeymoon Cabin, Cascade MT, listed on the NRHP in Montana
Charles M. Russell House and Studio, Great Falls, Montana, listed on the NRHP
Charles B. Russell House, Cincinnati OH, listed on the NRHP
Charles W. Russell House, Wheeling, West Virginia, listed on the NRHP

See also
Russell House (disambiguation)